Kluane is an electoral district that returns a member to the Legislative Assembly of the Canadian territory of Yukon.

Kluane  may also refer to:
 Kluane First Nation, a First Nations band government in the Yukon
 Kluane Lake, a lake in the Yukon
 Kluane National Park and Reserve, two protected areas in the Yukon
 Kluane tiger moth (Arctia brachyptera), a moth of the family Erebidae